Belmond Napasai is a resort hotel on the northern coast of Koh Samui, an island off the eastern edge of mainland Thailand It opened in February 2004.

Originally developed by Pansea Hotels & Resorts and named 'Pansea Samui', it was acquired by Orient-Express Hotels in 2006 and renamed 'Napasai'. In 2014 Orient-Express Hotels Ltd. changed its name to Belmond Ltd. and the hotel was renamed Belmond Napasai.

The property consists of 24 suites and private pool residences, and 45 villas. In 2010 development work took place to expand its private beach by 1,800 square metres.

In 2011 a lagoon and underwater nature reserve were created just offshore. Also part of this programme was the addition of an orchid farm and development of the hotel's spa and a 17-acre tropical garden.  Classes for Muay Thai (Thai boxing), cooking, language, massage, leather carving, drawing and photography take place in the gardens.

References

External links 
Official website

Belmond hotels
Hotels in Thailand
Buildings and structures in Surat Thani province
Hotels established in 2004
Hotel buildings completed in 2004